Teresita isaura is a moth in the family Oecophoridae. It was described by John Frederick Gates Clarke in 1978. It is found in Chile.

The wingspan is about 25 mm. The forewings are light ochraceous buff and the extreme base of the costa is cinnamon buff. There is an ill-defined cinnamon buff fascia from near the end of the cell to the tornus. The hindwings are ocherous white, darker toward the margins.

References

Moths described in 1978
Oecophorinae
Moths of South America
Endemic fauna of Chile